Losing Sleep may refer to::

Music

Albums
 Losing Sleep (Axle Whitehead album), 2008
 Losing Sleep (Edwyn Collins album), 2010, or its title track
 Losing Sleep (Parachute album), 2009
 Losing Sleep (Chris Young album), 2017

Songs
 "Losing Sleep" (John Newman song), 2013
 "Losing Sleep" (Chris Young song), 2017
 "Losing Sleep (Still, My Heart)", a composition by Vangelis

Other
Insomnia